David Spencer (born 3 December 1964) is a British former cyclist. He competed in the team time trial at the 1988 Summer Olympics.

References

External links
 

1964 births
Living people
British male cyclists
Olympic cyclists of Great Britain
Cyclists at the 1988 Summer Olympics
Sportspeople from Nottingham